The 2004 AFF Championship (officially known as the 2004 Tiger Cup for sponsorship reasons) was the 5th edition of the AFF Championship, the football championship of nations affiliated to the ASEAN Football Federation (AFF), and the last time under the name Tiger Cup. This was the first time a new format had been applied, with Group stage was jointly hosted by Vietnam and Malaysia from 7 to 16 December 2004, and top two teams from each group advanced to the Semi-finals and the Final, which was played in a two-leg home-and-away format from 28 December 2004 to 16 January 2005. This was also the final AFF Cup has a Third-place match, then it wasn't continued since the 2007 edition.

Thailand were the defending champions, but were eliminated in Group stage. Singapore won the tournament by a 5–2 victory in the two-legged final against Indonesia to secure their second title.

Summary 
In the group matches, Indonesia, coached by former Thailand coach Peter Withe, emerged as the Group A winners with ten points, 17 goals scored and none conceded. They were the hot favourites to win the 2004 AFF Championship after bundling out the hosts Vietnam with an unexpected 3–0 victory. Less than a day after the match had ended, the Vietnam Football Federation requested the resignation from its national coach Edson Tavares, despite his requests to stay on until the last match. Singapore, led by Radojko Avramović pipped out the hosts by just a single point and remained to be the only team in the championship to not lose a single match.

Following the tournament motto "Anything can happen", Myanmar, under coach Ivan Kolev emerged as the surprise, holding defending champions Thailand to a draw and beating Malaysia on their own turf.

Teams 
All teams from member associations of the ASEAN Football Federation (AFF) participated with the exception of Brunei.  However, they would be replaced by East Timor when sponsors Tiger Beer stated in May 2004 that the world's newest country at the time would be joining the competition.  This kept the tournament at 10 teams.

Squads

Venues

Tournament

Group stage

Group A 

 All times are Indochina Time (ICT) – UTC+7
 All matches played in Vietnam

Group B 

 All times are Malaysia Standard Time (MST) – UTC+8
 All matches played in Malaysia

Knockout stage

Semi-finals 
First Leg

Second Leg

Singapore win 8–5 on aggregate

Indonesia win 5–3 on aggregate

Third place play-off

Final 

First Leg

Second Leg

Singapore win 5–2 on aggregate

Awards

Goal scorers
7 goals
  Ilham Jaya Kesuma

6 goals

  Muhamad Khalid Jamlus
  Soe Myat Min
  Agu Casmir

5 goals
  Kurniawan Dwi Yulianto

4 goals

  Boaz Solossa
  Elie Aiboy
  Liew Kit Kong
  Noh Alam Shah
  Indra Sahdan Daud
  Sarayoot Chaikamdee
  Thạch Bảo Khanh
  Lê Công Vinh

3 goals
  Chalana Luang-Amath
  Emelio Caligdong

2 goals

  Mohd Amri Yahyah
  San Day Thien
  Daniel Bennett
  Khairul Amri
  Therdsak Chaiman
  Suriya Domtaisong
  Đặng Văn Thành

1 goal

  Hing Darith
  Hang Sokunthea
  Charis Yulianto
  Mahyadi Panggabean
  Muhammad Mauli Lessy
  Ortizan Solossa
  Visay Phaphouvanin
  Mohd Fadzli Saari
  Mohamad Nor Ismail
  Muhamad Kaironnisam Sahabudin Hussain
  Muhammad Shukor Adan
  Aung Kyaw Moe
  Min Thu
  Zaw Lynn Tun
  Myo Hlaing Win
  Chad Gould
  Baihakki Khaizan
  Itimi Dickson
  Hasrin Jailani
  Sharil Ishak
  Weerayut Jitkuntod
  Yuttajak Kornjan
  Ittipol Poolsap
  Sarif Sainui
  Banluesak Yodyingyong
  Januário do Rego
  Simon Diamantino
  Nguyễn Huy Hoàng
  Nguyễn Minh Phương

Own goal
  Sun Sampratna (For Vietnam)
  Sengphet Thongphachan (For Singapore)

Team statistics
This table will show the ranking of teams throughout the tournament.

Notes

References
General

 Stokkermans, Karel. "ASEAN ("Tiger") Cup 2004 (Vietnam)". RSSSF.

Specific

External links 
 Tiger Cup 2004 at AseanFootball.org

 
2004 in Asian football
2005 in Asian football
2004 in AFF football
2005 in AFF football
2004 in Malaysian football
2005 in Malaysian football
2004 in Vietnamese football
AFF Championship tournaments
2004
2004